An American Dream (also known as See You in Hell, Darling) is a 1966 American Technicolor drama film directed by Robert Gist and starring Stuart Whitman and Janet Leigh.  It was adapted from the 1965 Norman Mailer novel of the same name. The film received an Oscar nomination for Best Song for "A Time for Love," music by Johnny Mandel and lyrics by Paul Francis Webster.

Plot
Stephen Rojack, a war hero, returns home to become a tough-talking television commentator who strongly criticizes the police's inability to put an end to the criminal activities of Ganucci, an organized-crime figure.

Separated from his alcoholic wife Deborah, he goes to her seeking a divorce. A violent argument breaks out, ending with Rojack throwing her from a 30th-story window.

At the police station, where he tells the police his wife committed suicide, Rojack runs into Ganucci as well as the gangster's nephew Nicky and nightclub singer Cherry McMahon, a former girlfriend of his. Rojack resumes his romantic interest in Cherry, further infuriating the Ganuccis.

Barney Kelly, his dead wife's father, is suspicious about Deborah's death and confronts Rojack, getting him to admit his guilt. Instead of informing the police, Barney decides to let Rojack struggle with his conscience.

Meanwhile, bribing her with a singing contract, the Ganuccis are able to convince Cherry to lure Rojack into an ambush. At the last second, she breaks down and warns him. Rojack takes her gun and is able to shoot Nicky, but then is gunned down himself.

Cast

 Stuart Whitman as Stephen Richard Rojack
 Janet Leigh as Cherry McMahon (singing voice was dubbed by Jackie Ward)
 Eleanor Parker as Deborah Rojack
 Barry Sullivan as Lt. Roberts
 Lloyd Nolan as Barney Kelly
 Murray Hamilton as Arthur Kabot
 J.D. Cannon as Sgt. Walt Leznicki
 Susan Denberg as Ruta
 Les Crane as Nicky
 Peter Marko as Hoodlum 
 Warren Stevens as Johnny Dell
 Joe De Santis as Eddie Ganucci
 Stacy Harris as O'Brien
 Paul Mantee as Shago Martin
 Harold Gould as Ganucci's Attorney
 George Takei as Ord Long
 Kelly Jean Peters as Freya
 Hal K. Dawson as Apartment House Guard (uncredited)
 Richard Derr as Undetermined Role (uncredited)
 James Nolan as Monsignor (uncredited)

Production

When An American Dream bombed at the box office, the desperate distributors re-titled the film See You in Hell, Darling.

Review

The director intended to make a horror movie, but failed to create that effect: According to Time Out magazine, it turns out to be "just tediously violent".

See also
 List of American films of 1966

References

External links 
 
 
 

1966 films
1966 drama films
American drama films
1960s English-language films
Films based on American novels
Films based on works by Norman Mailer
Films scored by Johnny Mandel
Films set in Los Angeles
Uxoricide in fiction
Warner Bros. films
1960s American films